A bust is a sculpted or cast representation of the upper part of the human figure, depicting a person's head and neck, and a variable portion of the chest and shoulders. The piece is normally supported by a plinth. The bust is generally a portrait intended to record the appearance of an individual, but may sometimes represent a type. They may be of any medium used for sculpture, such as marble, bronze, terracotta, plaster, wax or wood.

As a format that allows the most distinctive characteristics of an individual to be depicted with much less work, and therefore expense, and occupying far less space than a full-length statue, the bust has been since ancient times a popular style of life-size portrait sculpture. It can also be executed in weaker materials, such as terracotta.

A sculpture that only includes the head, perhaps with the neck, is more strictly called a "head", but this distinction is not always observed. Display often involves an integral or separate display stand. The Adiyogi Shiva statue located in India representative of Hindu God Shiva is the world's largest bust sculpture and is 112 ft tall.

History

Antiquity
Sculptural portrait heads from classical antiquity, stopping at the neck, are sometimes displayed as busts. However, these are often fragments from full-body statues, or were created to be inserted into an existing body, a common Roman practice; these portrait heads are not included in this article. Equally, sculpted heads stopping at the neck are sometimes mistakenly called busts.

The portrait bust was a Hellenistic Greek invention (although the Egyptian bust presented below precedes Hellenic productions by five centuries), though very few original Greek examples survive, as opposed to many Roman copies of them. There are four Roman copies as busts of Pericles with the Corinthian helmet, but the Greek original was a full-length bronze statue. They were very popular in Roman portraiture.

The Roman tradition may have originated in the tradition of Roman patrician families keeping wax masks, perhaps death masks, of dead members, in the atrium of the family house. When another family member died, these were worn by people chosen for the appropriate build in procession at the funeral, in front of the propped-up body of the deceased, as an "astonished" Polybius reported, from his long stay in Rome beginning in 167 BC.  Later these seem to have been replaced or supplemented by sculptures. Possession of such imagines maiorum ("portraits of the ancestors") was a requirement for belonging to the Equestrian order.

Middle Ages
Some reliquaries were formed as busts, notably the famous Bust of Charlemagne in gold, still in the Aachen Cathedral treasury, from c. 1350. Otherwise it was a rare format.

Renaissance
Busts began to be revived in a variety of materials, including painted terracotta or wood, and marble. Initially most were flat-bottomed, stopping slightly below the shoulders. Francesco Laurana, born in Dalmatia, but who worked in Italy and France, specialized in marble busts, mostly of women.

Baroque
The round-bottomed Roman style, including, or designed to be placed on, a socle (a short plinth or pedestal), became most common. Gian Lorenzo Bernini, based in Rome, did portrait busts of popes, cardinals, and foreign monarchs such as Louis XIV. His Bust of King Charles I of England (1638) is now lost; artist and subject never met, and Bernini worked from the triple portrait painted by Van Dyck, which was sent to Rome. Nearly 30 years later, his Bust of the young Louis XIV was hugely influential on French sculptors. Bernini's rival Alessandro Algardi was another leading sculptor in Rome.

Pictorial timeline

See also
 Herma
 Portrait

Notes

References
Belting, Hans, An Anthropology of Images: Picture, Medium, Body, 2014, Princeton University Press, 9780691160962, google books
Stewart, Peter, Statues in Roman Society: Representation and Response, 2003, Oxford University Press, 9780199240944, google books

External links

 Livius.org: Bust gallery of famous ancient Greeks
 Oxford definition
 Dictionary.com definition

Types of sculpture
 

ja:胸像
oc:Bust